Gav Mordeh (also Romanized as Gāv Mordeh; also known as Gār Sardeh) is a village in Shamil Rural District, Takht District, Bandar Abbas County, Hormozgan Province, Iran. At the 2006 census, its population was 333, in 70 families.

References 

Populated places in Bandar Abbas County